The men's half marathon event at the 2011 All-Africa Games was held on 15 September.

Results

References
Results
Results

Half
Half marathons